Invaders from Space is a 1964 film edited together for American television from films #3 and #4 of the 1957 Japanese short film series Super Giant.

Plot
The story involves the superhero Starman who is sent by the Emerald Planet to protect Earth from the Salamander Men of the planet Kulimon in the Moffit galaxy who plan to destroy Earth.

American adaptation
The 9 Super Giant films were purchased for distribution to U.S. television and edited into 4 films by Walter Manley Enterprises and Medallion Films. The 2 original Japanese films which went into Invaders from Space (The Mysterious Spacemen's Demonic Castle and Earth on the Verge of Destruction) were 48 minutes and 39 minutes in duration. The two films were edited into one 78-minute film, resulting in a total of 9 minutes being cut from the two films during the re-editing. Also, most of the original music was replaced by library cues.

DVD release
Invaders from Space is currently available on DVD. Something Weird Video with Image Entertainment released the film and another Starman film, Atomic Rulers of the World on a single disc on December 10, 2002.

See also 
 Super Giant
 Atomic Rulers of the World
 Attack from Space
 Evil Brain from Outer Space

References

Ragone, August. THE ORIGINAL "STARMAN": The Forgotten Supergiant of Steel Who Fought for Peace, Justice and the Japanese Way Originally published in Planet X Magazine, included in Something Weird Video's DVD release.

External links 
 
 

1965 films
Super Giant films
1960s science fiction films
1960s Japanese films